The 1988 FIA European Formula 3 Cup was the fourth European Formula 3 Cup race and the first to be held at the Nürburgring on 25 September 1988. The race was won by German driver Joachim Winkelhock, driving for W.T.S. Racing Liqui Moly Equipe, who finished ahead of Italians Mauro Martini and Emanuele Naspetti.

Teams and drivers

References

FIA European Formula Three Cup
FIA European Formula 3 Cup